Stone City Christian Academy is a private Christian school located in Bedford, Indiana.

See also
 List of high schools in Indiana

References

External links
 Facebook Page

Christian schools in Indiana
Buildings and structures in Lawrence County, Indiana